[[File:Album leaf (muraqqa'), signed Muhammad Husayn (Mulla Muhammad Husayn Tabrizi), Iran, Qazvin, c. 1575 AD, ink, watercolour, and gold on paper - Aga Khan Museum - Toronto, Canada - DSC06883.jpg|thumb|right|Album leaf (muraqqa), signed Mohammad Hossein Tabrizi, Iran, Qazvin, ]]Mohammad Hossein Tabrizi''' was a Persian calligrapher in 16th-century Safavid Iran. Tabrizi learnt calligraphy from the famous Ahmad Mashhadi. He later became a teacher of the equally renowned Mir Emad Hassani. Due to his great command in the art of calligraphy, a renowned profession in Iran, he was bestowed with the honorary title mihin Ustad ("greatest master"). 

His father Mirza Shokrollah Isfahani was the mostowfi ol-Mamalek ("chief accountant") under Safavid Shah Tahmasp I (1524-1576), whereas he himself was vizier to Shah Ismail I (1501-1524). After losing favour under Ismail I, he was forced to move to Mughal India, where he lived until his death. Tabrizi reportedly created inscriptions for the masjeds (mosques) and khanqahs of Tabriz, but they have almost entirely been destroyed due to earthquakes that hit the city. After finishing these inscriptions, Tabrizi made the Hajj to Mecca and on his return solely devoted his time to copying the masterpieces of Persian poetry. A divan'' of the Persian poet Amir Shahi Sabzavari from Tabrizi's pen is located in the Cambridge University Library.

References 

1577 deaths
16th-century calligraphers of Safavid Iran
16th-century Iranian painters
Calligraphers from Tabriz
Iranian emigrants to the Mughal Empire